Barry Rippon (born 30 March 1940) is a former Australian rules footballer who played for the Fitzroy Football Club in the Victorian Football League (VFL).

Notes

External links 
		

Living people
1940 births
Australian rules footballers from Victoria (Australia)
Fitzroy Football Club players
Camperdown Football Club players